Clarendon Hills is a station on Metra's BNSF Line in Clarendon Hills, Illinois. The station is 18.3 rail miles (29.5 km) from Chicago Union Station, the east end of Metra service on this line. In Metra's zone-based fare system, Clarendon Hills is in zone D. As of 2018, Clarendon Hills is the 66th busiest of Metra's 236 non-downtown stations, with an average of 799 weekday boardings.

The inbound station building (south of the tracks) was staffed until June 11, 2018.  It later was replaced with an unmanned building. Groundbreaking was on Jan 6, 2020; ribbon-cutting was on Nov 7, 2022. The outbound side has only two small covered shelters, one of which also provides bicycle racks and the other is a weather-protected warming center. Clarendon Hills' central business district is directly southwest of the station.

Accident
Clarendon Hills was the site of a collision at 8:16 AM on Wednesday, May 11, 2022, between inbound Metra train #1242 and a box truck stopped on the tracks. One person, a 72-year-old Downers Grove woman aboard the train, was ejected from the first car and killed. At least four people were injured, including the train engineer and a conductor. The driver and two passengers of the truck escaped prior to the impact and were not injured. 

It was not immediately known why the truck was stopped, as there had been sufficient room for it to safely clear the crossing. The engineer had applied full emergency braking prior to impact. The NTSB investigation is still in progress; a preliminary report was issued June 15, 2022.

The schedule in effect on the day of the collision shows train #1242 as a local train, making all stops between Aurora and Chicago and departing from Clarendon Hills at 8:00 AM. Following the incident, inbound service was curtailed for the rest of the day, with outbound evening rush service being reduced; the Clarendon Hills station was open only to discharge passengers. Alternative options for passengers included  and Westmont stations, or the Union Pacific West Line. The following day, Metra ran a modified Saturday schedule, with all local trains serving all stops except Clarendon Hills. The station reopened on May 13, with regularly scheduled service, and the Prospect Avenue grade crossing has since reopened.

References

External links 

Station from Prospect Avenue from Google Maps Street View

Metra stations in Illinois
Former Chicago, Burlington and Quincy Railroad stations
Railway stations in DuPage County, Illinois
Clarendon Hills, Illinois